The table below lists the judgments of the Constitutional Court of South Africa delivered in 2008.

The members of the court at the start of 2008 were Chief Justice Pius Langa, Deputy Chief Justice Dikgang Moseneke, and judges Tholie Madala, Yvonne Mokgoro, Sandile Ngcobo, Bess Nkabinde, Kate O'Regan, Albie Sachs, Thembile Skweyiya, Johann van der Westhuizen and Zak Yacoob. Justice Madala retired in October and Edwin Cameron was appointed in his place.

References
 
 

2008
Constitutional Court
Constitutional Court of South Africa